Fata-a-iki (died 1896) was a patu-iki (king) of the Pacific Ocean island of Niue.

Reign
Fata-a-iki ruled from 1887 to 1896. He was the seventh king of the island, and the second to be of the Christian faith. He was anointed on November 21, 1888, although he began ruling the island the previous year, following the death of his predecessor, Tui-toga.

One of his first acts as patu-iki, in 1887, was to write a letter to the British monarch Queen Victoria, requesting that Niue become a protectorate of the British Empire, so as to prevent annexation by another colonial power. His letter read:

The letter was not answered, and King Fata-a-iki repeated his request in 1895, to no avail.

External links
King Fata-a-iki

Year of birth unknown
1896 deaths
History of Niue
Niuean monarchs